The Ebenalp (1,640 m) is the northernmost summit of the Appenzell Alps. The mountain is a popular hiking destination and has been accessible by cable car from Wasserauen since 1955.  Ebenalp attracts up to 200,000 visitors each year.

From the high plateau of the cable car station visitors have a panoramic view of the rolling hills of Appenzell. Trails start at the station and lead to a network of mountain huts. These hiking routes lead to sites such as Säntis and Seealpsee. The nearby Wildkirchli hut can be reached by hiking through a cave.

Gallery 4kt

External links

 Ebenalp Cable Car Station 
 Ebenalp: Map and Pictures

Mountains of the Alps
Mountains of Appenzell Innerrhoden
Tourist attractions in Switzerland
Cable cars in Switzerland
Tourist attractions in Appenzell Innerrhoden
Appenzell Alps
Mountains of Switzerland
One-thousanders of Switzerland